Nyssaceae is a family of flowering trees sometimes included in the dogwood family (Cornaceae). Nyssaceae is composed of 37 known species in the following five genera:

Camptotheca, the happy trees: two species in China
Davidia, the dove tree, handkerchief tree, or ghost tree: one species in central China
Diplopanax: two species in southern China and Vietnam
Mastixia: about nineteen species in Southeast Asia
Nyssa, the tupelos: about 7–10 species in eastern North America and East to Southeast Asia
Among the extinct genera of the family are Mastixicarpum, very similar to Diplopanax, and Tsukada, an extinct relative of Davidia.

In some treatments, Davidia is split off into its own family, the Davidiaceae. Diplopanax and Mastixia are also sometimes separated into the family Mastixiaceae. The Angiosperm Phylogeny Group APG III system included the genera of Nyssaceae within Cornaceae. The APG IV system recognizes Nyssaceae as a distinct family

References

 
Asterid families